Alois Confais (born 7 September 1996) is a French footballer who plays as a midfielder for  club Le Havre.

Career
Confais made his professional debut on 28 October 2015 in the Coupe de la Ligue against Troyes. He played the full game, which ended in a 2–1 away defeat. On 24 November 2018, Confais joined Championnat National side Le Mans after seven years with Troyes.

Having not been retained by Le Mans in 2020, Confais joined up with former Le Mans teammate Vincent Créhin at Cypriot club Nea Salamis Famagusta FC.

On 17 August 2022, Confais signed a two-year contract with Le Havre.

References

External links
 
 
 
 

1996 births
Sportspeople from Évreux
Footballers from Normandy
Living people
Association football midfielders
French footballers
France youth international footballers
ES Troyes AC players
Le Mans FC players
Nea Salamis Famagusta FC players
Olympiakos Nicosia players
Le Havre AC players
Ligue 1 players
Ligue 2 players
Championnat National players
Cypriot First Division players
French expatriate footballers
Expatriate footballers in Cyprus
French expatriate sportspeople in Cyprus